The occipital branch of posterior auricular artery passes backward, over the Sternocleidomastoideus, to the scalp above and behind the ear. It supplies the Occipitalis and the scalp in this situation and anastomoses with the occipital artery.

References 

Arteries of the head and neck